Fulton's Foods was a frozen food retailer chain, which is based in Darton, South Yorkshire, and operated throughout The Midlands and the North of England. It traded online as Star Bargains.

History
The company was founded by Jack Fulton in 1960 as a poultry business. It diversified into frozen foods in 1974, using the company name Frozen Value Ltd. In August 1997, it was then subject to a management buy-in, financed by 3i, when Kevin Gunter took control of the business.

In October 2005, it opened a  depot in Darton, South Yorkshire. and in March 2013, the company was rebranded Fulton's Foods.

The founder, Jack Fulton, died on 29 September 2015.

In March 2018, Fulton's Foods announced they were trading online as "Star Bargains". The offering excludes chilled & frozen.

In October 2020, Poundland announced they had purchased Fulton's Foods.

In February 2022, the company announced the closure of all remaining stores.

References

External links

Fulton's Foods website

Companies based in South Yorkshire
Retail companies established in 1960
Retail companies disestablished in 2022
Retail companies of England
Supermarkets of the United Kingdom
3i Group companies
1960 establishments in England
2022 disestablishments in England